This is a list of cities in the Bahamas.

List
The following table lists the city or town name, the geographic coordinates, the population at the 1990 census, an estimate of the population in 2009, and the island name.

See also
 Districts of the Bahamas
 Islands of the Bahamas

References

External links

 
Cities
Bahamas